John Sjogren may refer to:

John C. Sjogren, Medal of Honor recipient
John M. Sjogren, American film director